S38 may refer to:
 BMW S38, an automobile engine
 S38: In case of insufficient ventilation wear suitable respiratory equipment, a safety phrase
 Short S.38, a British biplane
 Sikorsky S-38, a 1928 American amphibious sesquiplane
 Sulfur-38, an isotope of sulfur
 , a submarine of the United States Navy